Al-Sultan Davud Siri Sundhura Bavana Mahaa Radun (Dhivehi: އައްސުލްޠާން ދާވޫދު ކަލަމިންޖާ ސިރީ ސުންދުރަ ބަވަނަ މަހާރަދުން) was the Sultan of the Maldives from 1302 to 1307. He was a son of Sultan Yoosuf I and succeeded his brother to the throne. Sultan Davud was the 16th sultan to ascend the throne from the Lunar dynasty.

References

1307 deaths
14th-century sultans of the Maldives
Year of birth unknown